MLB usually refers to Major League Baseball, the highest level of professional baseball/league in North America.

MLB may also refer to:

Arts, entertainment, and media
 989 Sports Major League Baseball series, video games
 Miraculous: Tales of Ladybug & Cat Noir, also known as Miraculous Ladybug or Miraculous, a French television series

People
 Miłosz Biedrzycki, Polish poet

Technology
 Motor life boat
 Volkswagen Group MLB platform, for modular vehicle manufacture

Other uses
 Minor League Baseball, a hierarchy of professional baseball leagues affiliated with Major League Baseball. MiLB is a more common abbreviation of Minor League Baseball.
 Bucerius Master of Law and Business
 Middle linebacker in American and Canadian football
 Morgan, Lewis & Bockius, an American multinational law firm
 MLB.com, a domain name owned by Morgan, Lewis & Bockius, then transferred to Major League Baseball
 Melbourne Orlando International Airport, Florida, US, IATA code